Wielki Buczek may refer to:

Wielki Buczek, Kępno County, a village in the administrative district of Gmina Rychtal
Wielki Buczek, Złotów County, Gmina Lipka